The Tambor-class submarine''' was a United States Navy submarine design, used primarily during World War II. They were the USN's first fully successful fleet submarine, and began the war close to the fighting. They went on to see hard service; seven of the twelve boats in the class were sunk before the survivors were withdrawn from front-line service in early 1945; this was the highest percentage lost of any US submarine class. Tautog was credited with sinking 26 ships, the largest number of ships sunk by a US submarine in World War II.

Design history

Preliminary designs
Early U.S. submarine designs of World War I assigned to escort shipping revealed that they had minimal ability to deter an aggressive threat. Despite the fact that German U-boats proved beyond a doubt that no navy could be a world sea power without submarines, the role played by U.S. submarines in the defense of the Pacific would have to be rethought by Navy planners.

Following the Armistice, and after testing the capabilities of German design via captured U-boats, the U.S. Navy began to see the potential for extended offensive submarine operations. Submarine operations with the fleet required boats with a high speed of 21 knots so that they could maneuver with the Standard-type battleships. A high endurance was also desired to enable sustained patrols in Japanese home waters, hopefully providing warning of enemy operations as well as sinking warships close to home. These qualities would later prove vital in commerce raiding during World War II, though this was largely absent from prewar planning due to the restrictions of the Washington Naval Treaty. The huge advancement in American technology required to fill that role with "a new all-purpose fleet submarine" also became apparent.

These produced a high speed with four engines clutched together in tandem pairs. This design resulted in excessive vibration and engine damage, and the class was decommissioned in the 1920s and scrapped in 1930. The second attempt was the Barracuda class; the first three V-boats, launched 1924–25. These combined large direct drive main diesels with small diesel-electric diesels to achieve 21 knots. Their engines, built by the Bureau of Steam Engineering (BuEng) based on German MAN designs, were unreliable and the boats had poor seakeeping qualities. They were decommissioned in 1937 and saw only limited service, mostly training and experimental, in World War II.

These were influenced by German "U-cruisers" such as the Type U-139 of World War I. Up to  overall and  surfaced displacement, these were the largest non-nuclear submarines ever built by the United States. They were armed with a pair of 6-inch deck guns to allow engaging armed merchant cruisers or Q-ships on the surface. However, their huge size was a disadvantage in most tactical situations. They could not dive quickly and were slow in maneuvering. They found a role inserting raiders and supplying guerrillas in World War II, famously in the Makin Island raid but also in the Philippines.

After the unsuccessful attempts outlined above, Navy designers finally worked towards a practical fleet submarine. The first successful approaches to this were the Porpoise or "P"-class and  /  or new "S"-class submarines, launched 1935–1939. These were smaller, more maneuverable boats than the cruiser-type V-boats. However, the "P" class was lacking in speed and their early diesel-electric propulsion was vulnerable to arcing. Although the new "S" class had a faster "composite" power plant combining direct drive and diesel-electric components, they were somewhat lacking in reliability and firepower. Some of the new "S" class were equipped with the Hooven-Owens-Rentschler double-acting diesels, which had poor reliability.

Tambor-class proposal

In the fall of 1937 a proposal for an improved fleet submarine was put forward by the team of officers put together by then-Commander Charles A. Lockwood (later Admiral and Commander Submarine Force Pacific), Lt. Cmdr. Andrew McKee, planning officer at Portsmouth Navy Yard, and Lt. Armand M. Morgan, head of the Navy's submarine design section. It was to be large (1,500 tons), and carry the latest diesel engines, ten torpedo tubes, a  gun, and an updated Torpedo Data Computer. Habitability would be increased by the addition of fresh water distillation units and air conditioning.

However, the design concepts faced opposition from Admiral Thomas Hart, Chairman of the General Board. Hart stubbornly defended the building of small, coastal defense boats (without "luxuries" like air conditioning, whose primary function was not comfort but the elimination of prevalent electrical shorts). Through determination and skilled political maneuvering, the design of Lockwood's team prevailed (though Hart would consent to only a  gun). As with other classes, the small gun was to prevent submarines from attempting to engage heavily armed escorts on the surface. This design was finally adopted by the Navy's General Board and the Submarine Officers' Conference for the 1939 program.

Design specifications

The Tambors had several key improvements over the Sargo class. For the first time in a US submarine, six bow torpedo tubes were equipped. This had been delayed for several years due to an overestimate of the tonnage required for the two extra tubes. The four stern tubes of the Sargos were retained. Larger torpedo rooms eliminated the deck stowage of torpedoes on previous classes, which was abandoned during World War II in any case. Combat efficiency was improved by relocating the sonar operators and the Torpedo Data Computer into an enlarged conning tower to enable direct communication with the captain, and a new periscope with a small head to avoid detection was equipped.Friedman, pp. 196-197 The "negative tank" or "down express" tank found on some World War I-era S-boats was revived; this could be quickly flooded when diving to provide negative buoyancy and get the submarine under water more quickly. The hull had improved streamlining for a higher cruising speed.

Although the Tambors were initially equipped with a 3-inch (76 mm)/50 caliber deck gun, Lockwood and the Submarine Officers' Conference prevailed upon Admiral Hart to allow a supporting deck strengthened to accommodate a 5-inch (127 mm)/51 caliber gun if experience warranted this. In 1942–43, four Tambors: SS-198, SS-199, SS-200 (which was the first one to be so modified, with USS Bonitas gun), SS-203, and two Gars: SS-206, SS-209, were rearmed with the 5-inch/51 guns. All pieces were taken from the Barracuda class or spares for that class, as they were the only class with a submarine "wet mount" for that gun. As with many other submarines that started the war with the 3"/50, the remaining Tambors received 4-inch (102 mm)/50 caliber guns removed from old S-boats that were being withdrawn from combat service.

The full diesel-electric propulsion plant found in a few Sargos was continued, and probably improvements over the Porpoise class eliminated the arcing that had plagued those boats. The "new S-class" had boats with either General Motors-Winton engines or Hooven-Owens-Rentschler (HOR) engines. The HOR engines proved very unreliable, and were replaced by early 1943. The non-GM engine selected was the Fairbanks-Morse 38 8-1/8 engine. Still used as backup power on nuclear submarines, this was one of the best submarine engines ever. The Tambors were lucky; twelve of the subsequent  boats were initially equipped with HORs, apparently to speed up production.

The Tambors had a significant weakness: all four engines were in one compartment, making the boat very vulnerable to damage.

Mine armament
The Tambor class could substitute mines in place of torpedoes. For the Mk 10 and Mk 12 type mines used in World War II, each torpedo could be replaced by as many as two mines, giving the submarine a true maximum capacity of 48 mines. However, doctrine was to retain at least four torpedoes on mine laying missions, which would limit the capacity to 40 mines, and this is often stated as the maximum in various publications. In practice during the war, submarines went out with at least 8 torpedoes, and the largest minefields laid were 32 mines. Post-war, the Mk 49 mine replaced the Mk 12, while the larger Mk 27 mine was also carried which only allowed one mine replacing one torpedo. 

Service

The remainder of the class was in the continental United States, recently commissioned or on trials. The bulk of the available submarines in the Pacific (not including any Tambors) had been forward deployed to the Philippines in October 1941. The Tambors went on to see hard service; seven of the twelve boats in the class were sunk before the survivors were withdrawn from front-line service for training and experimental duties in early 1945; this was the highest percentage lost of any US submarine class. Tautog was credited with sinking 26 ships, the largest number of ships sunk by a US submarine in World War II. Postwar,  was a target in the Operation Crossroads nuclear weapons tests at Bikini Atoll in 1946, but was only lightly damaged. She was later expended as a target in 1948.

Submarines in class

The last six of the Tambor class are often listed as "Gar-class" submarines. They were ordered in fiscal year 1940 (FY40); the previous six were ordered in FY39, and some design differences were anticipated. On 17 December 1938, the secretary of the navy decided that the FY40 class would duplicate the FY39 class.

See also
 List of most successful American submarines in World War II
 Allied submarines in the Pacific War
 Fleet submarine
 Unrestricted submarine warfare
 Torpedo
 List of submarine classes of the United States Navy
 List of lost United States submarines
 List of submarines of the Second World War

References

Citations

Sources
 Alden, John D., Commander (USN, Ret). The Fleet Submarine in the U.S. Navy: A Design and Construction History. Annapolis: Naval Institute Press, 1979. .
 
 Blair, Clay, Jr. Silent Victory: The U.S. Submarine War Against Japan. New York: Bantam, 1976. .
 Campbell, John Naval Weapons of World War Two (Naval Institute Press, 1985), 
 
 Gardiner, Robert and Chesneau, Roger, Conway's All the World's Fighting Ships 1922-1946, London: Conway Maritime Press, 1980. .
 Lenton, H. T. American Submarines (Navies of the Second World War) (Doubleday, 1973), .
 Roscoe, Theodore. United States Submarine Operations in World War II. Annapolis: Naval Institute Press, 1949. .
 Silverstone, Paul H., U.S. Warships of World War II'' (Ian Allan, 1965), .

External links

 On Eternal Patrol, website for lost US subs
 Navsource.org fleet submarines photo index page
 Pigboats.com pre-1941 submarine photo site
 DiGiulian, Tony Navweaps.com later 3"/50 caliber gun
 DiGiulian, Tony Navweaps.com 4"/50 caliber gun
 DiGiulian, Tony Navweaps.com 5"/51 caliber gun
 List of USN World War II fleet submarines at The Wayback Machine, archived from www.fleetsubmarine.com

Submarine classes
 
 Tambor